"Lydia" is a song by New Zealand band Fur Patrol from their debut studio album, Pet, released in 2000. Written by lead vocalist Julia Deans, the song is about a woman who observes that her ex-lover is in a new relationship with another woman—Lydia. The song spent 19 weeks on the New Zealand Singles Chart, peaking at number one on 24 December 2000. In 2001, it was voted the 19th best New Zealand song of all time by APRA. The song also won two awards at the 2001 New Zealand Music Awards: Single of the Year and Best Songwriter (awarded to Deans). "Lydia" was released in Australia on 18 March 2002 but did not chart.

Background and release
Deans said of the song, "It's a classic story. The jilted ex, and it's not necessarily an ex, walks into a cafe or bar and sees the significant other at a table with another other. We have all been there. It was drawn as much from one's own relationships as it was from other people's. When you are young, you end up being that person sitting in a bar and watching your recent beloved getting cosy with someone else. So I guess the song is about that moment when you know a relationship is over but are faced with the reality of it, that someone you thought you loved and thought loved you, has moved on."

In New Zealand and Australia, "Lydia" was issued as a CD single containing four tracks: the original version of "Lydia", an acoustic version as the closing track, and two other songs from Pet recorded during sessions with New Zealand radio manager Helen Young—"Andrew" and "Holy".

Credits and personnel
Credits are lifted from the Pet liner notes.

Studio
 Recorded and mixed at Marmalade Studio A (Wellington, New Zealand)
 Mastered at 301 Sydney (Sydney, Australia)

Fur Patrol
 Fur Patrol – writing
 Julia Deans – writing, vocals, guitar, keyboards
 Steven Wells – guitar
 Andrew Bain – bass keyboards
 Simon Braxton – drums, percussion

Other personnel
 David Long – production
 Mike Gibson – recording
 Sam Gibson – mixing, mastering
 Steve Smart – mastering

Charts

Weekly charts

Year-end charts

References

2000 singles
2000 songs
APRA Award winners
Number-one singles in New Zealand
Warner Music Group singles